Ali Akbar Feiz Aleni (2 December 1921 – 30 July 2007), better known as Ali Meshkini, was an Iranian cleric and politician.

Life
Meshkini was an Iranian Azerbaijani born in a village near Meshkin Shahr and the Sabalan mountain. He was born as Āli, but preferred the pronunciation Ali during his career. He succeeded Ayatollah Montazeri as chairman of the Iranian Assembly of Experts after the latter was ousted. The Assembly of Experts selects the Supreme Leader of Iran and supervises his activities.

Meshkini chaired the commission that drafted the amendment of 1989 to the 1979 constitution of Iran. Within the commission, he also chaired one of its four committees, the one tasked with drafting amendments that would strengthen the judiciary. As such, he was an influential force in changing the leadership of the judiciary from a triumvirate, the Supreme Judicial Council, to an individual in 1989.

He was the author of many books on Islamic jurisprudence and general issues of Islam. Mohammadi Reyshahri, Iran's minister of intelligence from 1984 to 1989, was Meshkini's son-in-law.

Meshkini was the chair of the Society of Seminary Teachers of Qom and also served as Friday prayer leader in Qom. Despite his old age and poor health, he became a candidate for re-election in 2006 Assembly of Experts elections.

Death
Meshkini died on 30 July 2007 at 16:30 local time, at Tehran Hospital, of respiratory and kidney failure.

Quotes and political views
Meshkini was known for his unyielding support of the likes of Ahmadinejad and the hardline politicians of Iran. He regarded the Iranian reformist movement "as a complete waste of time" and on several occasions called for the resignation of the likes of Mohammad Khatami.

After the election of Ahmadinejad, Meshkini spoke at a Friday prayer in Ardebil saying: "As the Supreme Leader of The Assembly of Experts of the Islamic Republic of Iran, it gives me great pleasure to announce that Dr. Mahmoud Ahmadinejad is our new President. From this moment onwards, we will follow his words (religiously). Our people in Azerbaijan will follow him alongside the Persians in the same spirit of brotherhood that we have kept for decades ... as Shi'ias".

After the Israel-Lebanon conflict, Meshkini has been quoted to say that "victory of the Lebanese Hizbollah over the Zionist regime was a divine phenomenon."

Referring to US occupation of Iraq, Meshkini said: "A bully has embarked on a military expedition and has attacked another bully in the midst of Islamic countries ... Look at what they have done and what they are doing under the pretext of freedom ... The mask of deception has been lifted from the face of Bush and Blair. It has become clear that they are both blood-sucking Hitlers."

References

External links 

 BBC on Assembly of Experts
 Friday Sermon at Qom: Pray that God Ends the Lives of Bush, Blair and Sharon Soon. Iranian Leaders Must Promote Nuclear Activities (video clip from 4 Dec. 2004)
 Friday Sermon at Qom: Pray that God Ends the Lives of Bush, Blair and Sharon Soon. Iranian Leaders Must Promote Nuclear Activities (transcript)

Iranian ayatollahs
People from Meshginshahr
1921 births
2007 deaths
Deaths from multiple organ failure
Combatant Clergy Association politicians
Speakers of the Assembly of Experts
Translators of the Quran into Persian
20th-century translators
Society of Seminary Teachers of Qom members
Members of the Assembly of Experts for Constitution